Power from Hell may refer to:
 Power from Hell (Onslaught album), or the title track
 Power from Hell (Toxic Holocaust album), 2004